Lone Star College–North Harris (formerly North Harris College, NHC) is a public community college, located in unincorporated Harris County, Texas, United States, adjacent to Houston and offering Associate's degrees and program certifications in over 110 fields of study. LSC-North Harris is a part of the Lone Star College System, a community college system that serves the Greater Houston area.

History
It was established in 1972 by voters in the Aldine, Humble and Spring Independent School Districts, located in the northern parts of Houston and Harris County. Lone Star College–North Harris, opened 1973, serves more than 11,000 students and is the district's only source for automotive technology, health information technology, child development and family studies, paralegal studies, medical assisting and pharmacy technology programs. To provide neighborhood centers that serve residents in the greater Greenspoint and South Aldine areas, Lone Star College–North Harris has two full-service satellite centers.

2013 shooting

On January 22, 2013, three people were injured in a shooting in the campus courtyard near the library. The gunman was heard arguing with a student named Jody Neal, and initially walked away but returned and pulled out a handgun from his backpack. The gunman shot Neal three times. A maintenance man was hit in the leg by a bullet. The shooter accidentally shot himself in the buttocks area. Witnesses said up to six shots were fired.

Immediately after the shooting, the campus was evacuated and put on "lockdown." Two individuals with multiple gunshot wounds were in serious condition at Ben Taub Hospital. A fourth person suffered a stroke and was also taken to the hospital. The shooter fled into nearby woods and was followed by officers who later apprehended him.

There were two people detained for further questioning and later that day, Carlton Berry, age 22, who is believed to be the gunman, was charged with aggravated assault in the shootings. These charges were later dropped.

Location
The LSC-North Harris campus is situated on 254 acres (1 km²) of land originally owned by Aldine ISD, located just several hundred feet from Aldine's Nimitz High School.

The Houston Weekend College of Our Lady of the Lake University previously operated at North Harris.

Degree and certificate programs

Health Professions Building

LSC-Health Professions Building opening June 2011; students who are currently accepted into LSC-North Harris' Nursing and Medical Assisting programs and LSC-Kingwood's Respiratory Therapy program will be attending classes spring 2011 in this fully renovated, . facility specifically designed for allied health occupations training. The building is located at 826 Peakwood Drive on FM 1960, just  from LSC-North Harris.

Programs that will be offered at the Health Professions Building includes: Nursing, Medical Assisting, Surgical Technology, Respiratory Technology, and Simulation lab.

Visit the campus construction updates page to view slide show and floor plans.

Clubs and organizations
 North Star News
 Student Activities
 Student Organizations 
Forensics

LSC-NH has an award-winning public speaking team headed by Wade Hescht. The program has won numerous national and regional speech and debate tournaments, including many Readers Theater championships.

References

External links

 LSC-North Harris
 
 
 LSC-Online
 MyRecords

North Harris
Education in Harris County, Texas
Buildings and structures in Harris County, Texas